Iulian Laurențiu Popescu (born 18 January 1997) is a Romanian professional footballer who plays  for CS Universitatea Craiova as a goalkeeper.

Honours
Universitatea Craiova
Cupa României: 2017–18, 2020–21
Supercupa României: 2021

References

External links
 
 

1997 births
Living people
People from Filiași
Romanian footballers
Association football goalkeepers
Liga I players
CS Universitatea Craiova players
CS Pandurii Târgu Jiu players
Liga II players
FC Brașov (2021) players